Richland Airport  is a public airport located two miles (3 km) northwest of the central business district of Richland, a city in Benton County, Washington, United States. It is owned by the Port of Benton.

History

The airport, originally named Atomic Energy Field, was constructed in 1943 by the United States Atomic Energy Commission for use by personnel at the Hanford Site. The Port of Benton acquired the airport in December 1961, opening it for public use.

Facilities and aircraft

For the 12-month period ending July 31, 2007, the airport had 29,000 general aviation aircraft operations, an average of 79 per day. There are 202 aircraft based at this airport: 87% single-engine, 2% multi-engine, 1% helicopter, 4% glider and 6% ultralight.

References

External links
 Richland Airport at Port of Benton
 Richland Airport at Washington State DOT

Airports in Washington (state)
Transportation buildings and structures in Benton County, Washington
Richland, Washington